Hakan Yılmaz may refer to:

  (born 1969), Turkish actor and comedian in films such as Kanalizasyon
 Hakan Yılmaz (political scientist)
 Hakan Yılmaz (weightlifter) (born 1982), Turkish Olympic weightlifter